The 2019  ASEAN Basketball League (ABL) Finals was the best-of-5 championship series of the 2018–19 ABL season and the conclusion of the season's playoffs. BTN CLS Knights Indonesia and Singapore Slingers competed for the 9th championship contested by the league. After a decider Game 5, CLS Knights Indonesia eventually clinched the club's first franchise championship in its history, and the second ABL Championship that came from Indonesia. Maxie Esho was named as the Finals MVP.

Background

Head-to-head matchups 

This is the first playoff and finals meeting between BTN CLS Knights Indonesia and Singapore Slingers.

Series summary

Game summaries 
All times local; UTC+7 for Indonesia, and UTC+8 for Singapore.

Game 1

Game 2

Game 3

Game 4

Game 5

Rosters

Singapore Slingers

BTN CLS Knights Indonesia

References

External links 

2018–19 ABL season